Anna Galeotti (1739–1773) was an Italian engraver and painter.

Biography
Born in Florence, Galeotti trained under the engraver Cosimo Colombini. She then studied painting under Violante Cerroti. Finally she worked also under Giuseppe Parenti, a pupil of Vincenzo Meucci.

Galeotti painted a St Lawrence for the church of Castelbonfi. She painted altarpieces for churches in Porciano, Pontedera, and Lari. She settled and married in Arezzo, where she continued to paint, including a canvas for the Capuchin priests. She was in demand as a portraitist.

References

1739 births
1773 deaths
18th-century Italian painters
18th-century Italian women artists
Italian women painters
Italian engravers
Painters from Tuscany
Women engravers